Zhang Xiaofei may refer to:

Zhang Xiaofei (footballer) (张笑非; born 1982), Chinese footballer
Zhang Xiaofei (actress) (张小斐; born 1986), Chinese actress